Tej Tadi is a neuroscientist, engineer and entrepreneur. He is the founder and CEO of MindMaze, a company valued at over $1 billion, that is pioneering a computing platform capturing neural and ambient signatures based on intent.

Early life and education 

Tej Tadi was born in a family of physicians in Hyderabad. After studying Electronics Engineering in India, he moved to Switzerland in 2004 to pursue his PhD, which he received from the Ecole Polytechnique Fédérale de Lausanne (EPFL). His topic was Neural Mechanisms of the Embodied Self: Merging virtual reality and electrical neuroimaging. He is on the international advisory board of the Brain Forum.

Public and media appearances 
Tej Tadi has delivered talks at scientific conferences and meetings around the world on his research. He has been profiled in Forbes, Fortune, and Techcrunch. He appeared at TEDxLausanne in 2014 to speak about accelerating recovery after a stroke.

Patents filed

Awards and honours
In 2009, the Pfizer Foundation awarded Tadi the neuroscience research prize. In 2011, he also received the Chorafas Foundation Award for his work. In 2012, the IMD Business School honoured Tej with its startup prize. In 2015, The World Economic Forum named him a Young Global Leader. In 2016, he was named EY Entrepreneur of the Year.

Notable research articles 
Tej Tadi has co-authored several peer-reviewed journal articles in the areas of embodied self, manipulating bodily self-consciousness, boundaries of agency and conscious experience humans and neurorehabilitation using virtual reality and brain imaging techniques.

References 

1981 births
Living people
École Polytechnique Fédérale de Lausanne alumni
Indian neuroscientists
Scientists from Hyderabad, India